Khaled Saad Salem Al-Malta'ah is a Jordanian former footballer.

Career statistics

International
Scores and results list Oman's goal tally first.

References

External links
 
 
 

1981 births
Living people
Jordanian footballers
Jordan international footballers
Jordanian expatriate footballers
Association football defenders
2004 AFC Asian Cup players
Nejmeh SC players
Expatriate footballers in Lebanon
Jordanian expatriate sportspeople in Lebanon
Zamalek SC players
Expatriate footballers in Egypt
Jordanian expatriate sportspeople in Egypt
Salalah SC players
Fanja SC players
Expatriate footballers in Oman
Jordanian expatriate sportspeople in Oman
Al-Faisaly SC players
Egyptian Premier League players
Lebanese Premier League players